The Manhattan Carnegie Library Building in Manhattan, Kansas, United States, is a Carnegie Library built in 1904. It was listed on the National Register of Historic Places in 1987.

It is now used as the annex for the Riley County Courthouse.

References

Library buildings completed in 1904
Buildings and structures in Riley County, Kansas
Carnegie libraries in Kansas
Neoclassical architecture in Kansas
Libraries on the National Register of Historic Places in Kansas
Manhattan, Kansas
National Register of Historic Places in Riley County, Kansas